"They" is the first single released by Welsh singer Jem from her debut album, Finally Woken (2004). It includes a sample of the Swingle Singers' 1963 adaptation of Johann Sebastian Bach's Prelude in F minor (BWV 881) from Book II of Well-Tempered Clavier from their album Jazz Sebastian Bach. "They" was released in the United States in February 2004 and was issued worldwide the following year. The song became Jem's most successful single, reaching number six on the UK Singles Chart, number one in Hungary, and the top 20 in Austria, Ireland, and Greece.

Music videos
Jem released two music videos for "They". The UK version, directed by Laurent Briet, features Jem stripping herself in a spaceship in the style of Jane Fonda in the opening scene of Barbarella (although she remains covered by strategically placed light based holograms of planetary orbital paths); this is actually a boy dreaming about her as he constructs a model of the same spaceship back on Earth. The US version features Jem walking at a park while being accompanied by a number of children. She then encounters several signs and decides to violate them. Some intercut scenes show her at a roundabout being spun by children.

Track listings
UK CD1
 "They"
 "Maybe I'm Amazed" (Paul McCartney)

UK CD2 and Australian CD single
 "They" (original version)
 "They" (Cut Chemist remix)
 "They" (MDK & Ayesha Mix) (Eye in the Sky mix)
 "They" (video)

Charts

Weekly charts

Year-end charts

Release history

References

2003 songs
2004 debut singles
2005 singles
Arrangements of compositions by Johann Sebastian Bach
ATO Records singles
Number-one singles in Hungary
Jem (singer) songs
Songs written by Jem (singer)
Sony BMG singles
Popular songs based on classical music